Winter in the Woods (German: Waldwinter, "Forest Winter") is a 1936 German drama film directed by Fritz Peter Buch and starring Viktor Staal, Hansi Knoteck and Hans Zesch-Ballot. It was shot at the Babelsberg Studios of UFA in Berlin. The film's sets were designed by the art director Max Mellin. It was remade in 1956 under the same title.

Cast

References

Bibliography 
 Klaus, Ulrich J. Deutsche Tonfilme: Jahrgang 1936. Klaus-Archiv, 1988.
 Williams, Alan. Film and Nationalism. Rutgers University Press, 2002.

External links 
 

1936 films
1936 drama films
German drama films
Films of Nazi Germany
1930s German-language films
Films directed by Fritz Peter Buch
Films set in Prussia
Films set in forests
UFA GmbH films
German black-and-white films
1930s German films
Films shot at Babelsberg Studios